The men's hammer throw at the 1962 European Athletics Championships was held in Belgrade, then Yugoslavia, at JNA Stadium on 15 and 16 September 1962.

Medalists

Results

Final
16 September

Qualification
15 September

Participation
According to an unofficial count, 20 athletes from 13 countries participated in the event.

 (1)
 (1)
 (2)
 (2)
 (1)
 (2)
 (1)
 (3)
 (3)
 (1)
 (1)
 (1)
 (1)

References

Hammer throw
Hammer throw at the European Athletics Championships